HMS Lord Clive was the lead ship of her class of eight monitors built for the Royal Navy during World War I. Their primary armament was taken from obsolete pre-dreadnought battleships. The ship spent the war in the English Channel bombarding German positions along the Belgian coast as part of the Dover Patrol, often serving as a flagship. She participated in the failed First Ostend Raid in 1918, bombarding the defending coastal artillery as the British attempted to block the Bruges–Ostend Canal. Lord Clive was one of two ships in the class fitted with a single  gun in 1918, but she only fired four rounds from it in combat before the end of the war in November. The ship conducted gunnery trials after the war and was sold for scrap in 1927.

Design 
All of the British monitors built during the war were intended to bombard land targets. To this end the Lord Clive class were given a heavy armament modified to increase its range and a shallow draught to allow them to work inshore as necessary. As the Royal Navy did not expect the ships to engage in naval combat, speed was very much not a priority.
She displaced  at deep load and her crew numbered 12 officers and 182 ratings. The ship was powered by a pair of four-cylinder Harland & Wolff triple-expansion steam engines, each driving one propeller shaft using steam provided by two water-tube boilers. On her sea trials Lord Clive only made  because her designers were unfamiliar with the proper way to contour her hull to maximise her propeller efficiency; the ship reached  in service as she was more heavily loaded.

Armament, fire control, and armour
To suit their new role as long-range bombardment weapons, the turrets were modified to increase the maximum elevation of the guns from 13.5° to 30°. Their secondary armament consisted of a pair of quick-firing (QF) 12-pounder guns on low-angle mounts. Anti-aircraft defence was provided by a single Vickers QF 3-pounder Mk I gun and a QF 2-pounder Mk I gun.

The spotting top on the tripod mast between the turret and the funnel housed a rangefinder that fed data to the director on the roof of the spotting top. The director's crew would calculate the amount of traverse and elevation needed to hit the target and transmit that information to the turret for the guns to follow.

The Lord Clive-class ships were protected against gunfire by a sloping waterline belt amidships of  Krupp cemented armour (KCA) that was closed off at its ends by transverse bulkheads of equal thicknesses to form the ships' central armoured citadel. The  upper deck of high-tensile steel served as the roof of the citadel and the forecastle deck above it consisted of  plates of high-tensile steel.

The turret taken from Magnificent retained its original armour, viz.  faces and  sides with a 2-inch roof, all of Harvey armour. Its original circular barbettes was replaced by a new one formed from a dozen plates of  KCA.

Wartime modifications 

A pair of QF 6-inch guns with 200 rounds per gun were added in early 1916 abreast the funnel when it was realized that the two 12-pounder guns were not powerful enough to defend the ship from German destroyers. These guns were later exchanged for longer-ranged 6-inch Mk VII guns. By 1918 they had been replaced in their turn by four BL  Mk IX guns abreast the bridge. The 12-pounder guns were replaced, probably in 1917, by QF  Mk I anti-aircraft guns.

The biggest change was the addition of a BL  Mk I gun in an enormous gun shield mounted abaft the engine room, fixed over the starboard side. The gun itself could traverse 20°, but the gun shield was fixed. This weight so far aft promised to increase the draught at the stern enough that the after inboard compartments of the torpedo bulge, which were normally free-flooding, were closed up, but the ship's draught increased to  forward and  aft. The gun was hydraulically worked, but the ammunition parties had to use muscle power. The shells were stowed below deck and had to be moved by overhead rail to the hatch in the deck behind the gun to be lifted up and loaded. The cordite propellant charges were kept in eighteen steam-heated storage tanks mounted on the forecastle deck abaft the funnel and moved to the gun on a bogie mounted on rails, two one-sixth charges at a time, reducing the rate of fire to about one round every 3–4 minutes. The interior of the ship was extensively modified to accommodate the larger crew of 278 officers and men, storage and handling gear for the sixty 18-inch shells, and to support the weight of the gun mount. Other changes included the transfer of the radio room down into the hold, the addition of a new gyrocompass, enlarging the bridge and rearranging the existing magazines and storage spaces. A pair of additional two-pounder AA guns were also installed on top of the gun shield.

Construction and career 
Lord Clive, named after Major-General Lord Robert Clive, the first British Governor of the Bengal Presidency, has been the only ship of her name to serve in the Royal Navy. She was laid down with the name M.6 on 9 January 1915 at Harland & Wolff's Berth no. 3 in its shipyard in Belfast, Northern Ireland, as yard number 478 and was renamed Lord Clive on 8 March. The ship was launched on 10 June and completed on 10 July at an estimated cost of about £260,000.

A replica had been laid out there of some of the principal features of the Belgian coast near Zeebrugge and the ships practised their manoeuvring and spotting arrangements. Two tripods were dropped in the sea, housing observers which could triangulate the fall of shot and signal corrections to the monitors. One problem was that the modified 12-inch gun mounts broke down quite a bit, as they had not been designed to fire at angles up to 30° and many of their components were quite elderly. The ships were judged ready and a bombardment was planned on 21 August. Lord Clive anchored and opened fire at 05:36 on the locks of the Zeebrugge Canal that led to the German naval base at Bruges, Belgium. She fired 31 shells at the locks over an hour and a half before switching targets to a nearby factory which received eleven rounds. Vice-Admiral Reginald Bacon ordered the ships to cease-fire after two hours, cancelling the plans to bombard Ostend as well since both Sir John Moore and Prince Rupert had been suffering significant problems with their turrets. The bombardment was ineffectual; two barges were sunk, but the locks were not hit. The British judged this a good first try and planned for a bombardment of Ostend once Sir John Moore and Prince Rupert had been repaired.

Visibility was excellent everywhere but over the target which was covered by a haze, and Bacon, using Lord Clive as his flagship, ordered a withdrawal. German submarines and aircraft attacked as they were leaving, but the monitors took no damage. The monitors returned in the afternoon when the haze cleared and Lord Clive opened fire at 15:30 with a ranging shot on the Ostende lighthouse. The newly emplaced Tirpitz Battery of four long-range  guns started to return fire and soon began to near-miss Lord Clive. She steamed out to sea to open up the range, but her speed was so slow that the Germans had no difficulties compensating for the additional range and she was hit four times in quick succession about 15:50. One shell hit on the port bulge aft, another alongside the bulge forward, one on the bow and another, that failed to explode, on the starboard two-pounder gun, knocking the gun down to the quarterdeck. Only fourteen rounds were fired by the monitors before Bacon ordered them to retire, one of which set part of the dockyard on fire.

Another attempt was made on 19 September where the newly arrived monitor  attempted to suppress the four guns of the Tirpitz Battery with her  guns, while Lord Clive and Sir John Moore bombarded Ostend from positions thought to be outside the traversing limits of the German battery. This proved not to be the case and the monitors only managed a few rounds before they had to withdraw. On the 25th Lord Clive and several other monitors bombarded German positions at Westende as part of a deception operation to suggest that the Allies were launching an attack in that sector. During the remainder of September and October, she occasionally fired on German coastal batteries. During one of these later shoots the ship's left gun burst when a shell prematurely detonated inside the barrel.

1916 

During December 1915 and January 1916, Lord Clive was stationed in the Thames Estuary as a propaganda exercise to shoot down approaching German Zeppelins with shrapnel shells fired by her main guns, but the Zeppelins never came within range. Rear-Admiral (Contre-amiral) Charles de Marliave hoisted his flag aboard the ship and assumed command of a division of monitors as they bombarded German batteries at Westende on 26 January using the newly developed air-spotting techniques, but she only fired about eleven rounds during the half-hour bombardment. This was the last bombardment for the next seven months as the monitors were used to support British light forces and the Dover Barrage, the complex of minefields and nets in the Channel. Lord Clive was refitted during this period with a pair of six-inch guns to enhance her armament against German ships. This came in handy on 8 June when she, along with other monitors and destroyers, rebuffed an attempt by a dozen German ships to clear the nets and sweep the minefields. Lord Clive participated in a deception operation on 8 July when she, as well as French  guns, fired blanks to cover the fire of the brand-new 12-inch Dominion Battery at Adinkerke as it targeted the Tirpitz Battery. The ship was fitted with a dummy second funnel to make the Germans think that she was a new monitor. The idea was to deceive the Germans as to the true origin of the shells landing around the battery, but the Germans were not totally deceived and retaliated against the French guns. After inspecting the Dominion Battery on 13 August, King Albert I of Belgium and his family visited the monitor.

Lord Clive and all of the other monitors of the Dover Patrol simulated preparations for an amphibious landing during the later stages of the Battle of the Somme by firing on German positions at Westende between 8 and 15 September 1916. She fired only 74 rounds during this period as the smaller monitors spent a considerable amount of time acting as offshore aiming marks for the three larger  monitors. This was the last bombardment of 1916 as the monitors reverted to their role of supporting the Dover Barrage and patrolling between Calais and The Downs. Lord Clive was given a refit in the Trafalgar dry dock at Southampton during October–November.

1917–1918 
The monitor was nearby when a small group of German torpedo boats bombarded Dunkirk, France, during the night of 23/24 April 1917, and attempted to engage them in the darkness. She fired several rounds from her six-inch guns to little effect.
Lord Clive was intended to be used during the Great Landing, a plan to land troops between Westende and Middelkerke to exploit the anticipated Allied gains made during the Battle of Passchendaele in July and pocket German troops between the landing and the advancing troops. The troops were to be landed via three enormous  pontoons, each of which could carry a brigade of infantry, an artillery battery and three tanks. Each of the pontoons was lashed in position between two monitors and Lord Clive, together with Sir John Moore, was modified in March 1917 to handle one of them. The ship and her sisters rehearsed their role up until mid-July when the battle began, but the Allies could not make the ten-mile (16 km) advance necessary to launch the operation. Field Marshal Haig refused to support Bacon's proposal for a more modest landing in the Nieuport-Middelkerke area in September, so the operation was cancelled on 2 October.

Lord Clive was drydocked at Plymouth in October and resumed patrols in the Channel before she was taken in hand between 5 December 1917 and 6 April 1918 for modifications to mount the spare 18-inch gun from the large light cruiser , although the gun and mount themselves would not be delivered until 7 September. She bombarded the Tirpitz and Aachen Batteries at Ostend, along with three other monitors, which fired fifty rounds between them during the abortive first attempt to block the Bruges–Ostend Canal that led to the naval base at Bruges on the night of 11 April. The ship supported the Inshore Squadron making the landing attempt during the First Ostend Raid on 23 April with about fifty rounds of 12-inch and some 6-inch shells. Lord Clive relieved the monitor  as guardship at Yarmouth for five weeks while the latter was refitted. She arrived at Portsmouth on 16 August to have her 18-inch gun fitted. The monitor began operational trials with her new gun on 13 October. She fired one round on 14 October at the bridge at Snaeskerke during the morning, but received no spotting. The ship fired another three rounds later in the day but had to cease fire to avoid hitting friendly advancing troops.

Peacetime 
Lord Clive was paid off almost immediately after the end of the war and laid up at Immingham. She was towed to Portsmouth in September 1920 to conduct trials with a triple 15-inch gun mount. The Royal Navy had no experience with firing three-gun salvoes from a single turret and wanted to investigate interference between the guns. Her 18-inch gun was removed, along with her secondary armament, and the three guns were installed on the 18-inch mount, covered only by a canvas screen. She recommissioned on 15 December, but she was not ready to conduct the trials until 1 February 1921 at Shoeburyness Range. They revealed no serious problems and she was paid off in August 1921 in Portsmouth. Lord Clive remained there until sold for scrap on 10 October 1927 for £13,500.

References

Bibliography
  Vol. 1 • Vol. 2
 
 
 
 
 

 

Lord Clive-class monitors
Ships built in Belfast
1915 ships
World War I monitors of the United Kingdom
Royal Navy ship names
Ships built by Harland and Wolff